Kostrzynek  is a village in the administrative district of Gmina Wysoka, within Piła County, Greater Poland Voivodeship, in west-central Poland.

When this area was part of Prussia, it was known as Künstrinchen or Küstrinchen.

References

Kostrzynek